The following is a summary of the 2012–13 season of competitive football in Russia.

Promotion and relegation

Premier League

First Division

Second Division

2012–13 Russian Cup

2012 Russian Super Cup

Europe 2012-13

UEFA Champions League

UEFA Europa League

Managerial Changes

Last updated: 26 May 2013

Transfers

References

 
Seasons in Russian football